Zied Bhairi (born 5 February 1981) is a Tunisian footballer. He currently plays for the Libyan Premier League club Tahaddy.

Bhairi has a brief spell with SpVgg Greuther Fürth but did not appear in any 2. Bundesliga matches.

International
He was part of the Tunisian 2004 Olympic football team, who exited in the first round, finishing third in group C, behind group and gold medal winners Argentina and runners-up Australia.

References

External links

1981 births
Living people
Tunisian footballers
SpVgg Greuther Fürth players
ACF Gloria Bistrița players
Expatriate footballers in Germany
Footballers at the 2004 Summer Olympics
Olympic footballers of Tunisia
Tunisia international footballers
Liga I players
Espérance Sportive de Tunis players
Expatriate footballers in Romania
Tunisian expatriate sportspeople in Romania
Footballers from Tunis
Association football defenders